

This is a list of the National Register of Historic Places listings in Travis County, Texas.

This is intended to be a complete list of the properties and districts on the National Register of Historic Places in Travis County, Texas, United States. The locations of National Register properties and districts for which the latitude and longitude coordinates are included below, may be seen in a map.

There are 210 properties and districts listed on the National Register in the county, including 2 National Historic Landmarks.

Current listings

|}

Former listings

|}

See also 

List of National Historic Landmarks in Texas
National Register of Historic Places listings in Texas
Recorded Texas Historic Landmarks in Travis County

References

Travis County